The history of Moldova can be traced to the 1350s, when the Principality of Moldavia, the medieval precursor of modern Moldova and Romania, was founded. The principality was a vassal of the Ottoman Empire from 1538 until the 19th century. In 1812, following one of several Russian-Turkish wars, the eastern half of the principality, Bessarabia, was annexed by the Russian Empire. In 1918, Bessarabia briefly became independent as the Moldavian Democratic Republic and, following the decision of the Parliament (Sfatul Țării), united with Romania. During the Second World War it was occupied by the Soviet Union which reclaimed it from Romania. It joined the Union as the Moldavian ASSR, until the dissolution of the USSR. In 1991 the country declared independence as the Republic of Moldova.

Prehistory

In 2010 Oldowan flint tools were discovered at Dubasari on the lower Dniester that are 800,000–1.2 million years old demonstrating that early humans were present in Moldova during the early paleolithic. During prehistoric times there was a succession of cultures that flourished in the land of present-day Moldova from the end of the ice age up through the Neolithic Age, the Copper Age, the Bronze Age, and the beginning of the Iron Age, when historical records begin to be made about the people who lived in these lands.  These cultures included the Linear Pottery culture (ca. 5500–4500 BC), the Cucuteni-Trypillian culture (ca. 5500–2750 BC), and the Yamna culture (ca. 3600–2300 BC).  During this period of time many innovations and advancements were made, including the practice of agriculture, animal husbandry, kiln-fired pottery, weaving, and the formation of large settlements and towns.  Indeed, during the Cucuteni-Trypillian Culture, some of the settlements in this area were larger than anywhere on Earth at the time, and they predate even the earliest towns of Sumer in the Mesopotamia.  The area, stretching from the Dnieper River in the east to the Iron Gate of the Danube in the west (which included the land now in Moldova), had a civilization as highly advanced as anywhere else on Earth during the Neolithic period.

The question as to why this area did not remain at the forefront of technological and social development lies in the subsequent history of its geographical location.  At the end of the mostly peaceful Neolithic period, this area became a highway for invaders from the east moving into Europe.  By the time the historical written record begins to cover this area, it has already seen a number of invasions sweep over it, leaving social and political upheaval in their wake.  This trend was to continue on a fairly regular basis up until the 20th century.  With so much destruction, it was difficult for the residents of this area to recover from each successive invasion before encountering the next.

Antiquity and early Middle Ages

In recorded antiquity Moldova's territory was inhabited by several tribes, mainly by Akatziroi, and at different periods also by Bastarnae, Scythians and Sarmatians. Between the 1st and 7th centuries AD, the south was intermittently under the Roman, then Byzantine Empires. Due to its strategic location on a route between Asia and Europe, Moldova was repeatedly invaded by, among others, the Goths, Huns, Avars, Magyars, Pechenegs, Cumans, and the Mongols. The First Bulgarian Empire ruled the area or parts of it from the late 7th century/early 8th century until the late 10th century, the Principality of Halych in the 12th century and the Second Bulgarian Empire from the early 13th century with interruptions until the early 14th century. The colonists of the Genoa Republic also left a trace in this region. The Hypatian Chronicle mentioned the name of the Bolokhoveni (the 13th century) a purportedly Romanian population connected to Voloch, the East Slavic exonym of the Romanians. Alexandru V. Boldur identified the Bolohoveni as Romanians.

Principality of Moldavia

The medieval Principality of Moldavia was established in 1359 and covered the so-called Carpathian–Danube–Dniester area, stretching from Transylvania in the west to the Dniester River in the east. Its territory comprised the present-day territory of the Republic of Moldova, the eastern 8 of the 41 counties of Romania (a region still called  Moldova by the local population), the Chernivtsi oblast and Budjak region of Ukraine. Its nucleus was in the northwestern part, the Țara de Sus ("Upper Land"), part of which later became known as Bukovina. The name of the principality originates from the Moldova River.

The foundation of Moldavia is attributed to the Vlach (an old exonym for Romanian) noblemen Dragoş of Bedeu, from the Voivodeship of Maramureș, who had been ordered in 1343 (1285 after other sources) by the Hungarian king to establish a defense for the historic Kingdom of Hungary against the Tatars, and Bogdan I of Cuhea, another Romanian from Maramureș, who became the first independent prince of Moldavia, when he rejected Hungarian authority in 1359. Bogdan I left his lands from Maramureș with his army and part of the Romanian population, by crossing the mountains to the east, after entering in conflict with the Hungarian rulers.

Moldova also had rich political relations with Poland. In 1387, the great hospodar of Moldova, Peter I, paid a feudal tribute to the Polish king. For the next one hundred and fifty years, relations between Moldova and Poland were periodically friendly, and occasionally conflict.

The greatest Moldavian personality was prince Stephen the Great, who ruled from 1457 to 1504. He fought the Hungarian Kingdom, the Polish Kingdom and the Ottoman Empire, with success, for the most part of his rule.

Stephen III was succeeded by increasingly weaker princes, and in 1538 Moldavia became a vassal of the Ottoman Empire, to which it owed a percentage of the internal revenue, that in time rose to 10%. Moldavia was forbidden to have foreign relations to the detriment of the Ottoman Empire (although at times the country managed to circumvent this interdiction), but was allowed internal autonomy, including sole authority over foreign trade. Turks were legally forbidden to own land or build religious establishments in Moldavia. Prince Vasile Lupu had secured the Moldavian throne in 1634 after a series of complicated intrigues, and managed to hold it for twenty years. Lupu was a capable administrator and a brilliant financier, and soon was the richest man in the Christian East. Judiciously placed gifts kept him on good terms with the Ottoman authorities.

In the 18th century, the territory of Moldavia often became a transit or war zone during conflicts between the Ottomans, Austrians, and Russians. In 1774, following a victory in a war against the Ottomans, Russia occupied Christian Moldavia, still a vassal of the Ottoman Empire at the time. In 1775, the Habsburg monarchy annexed ca 11% of the territory of Moldavia, which became known as Bukovina. By the Treaty of Bucharest following the Russo-Turkish War (1806–1812), Russia had annexed further 50% of its territory, which became known as Bessarabia.

Part of the Russian Empire

With the notable exception of Transnistria, the territory of today's Republic of Moldova covers most of the historical region of Bessarabia. Until 1812, the term "Bessarabia" referred to the region between the Danube, Dniester, the Black Sea shores, and the Upper Trajan Wall, slightly larger than what today is called Budjak. By the Treaty of Bucharest of May 28, 1812 between the Ottoman Empire and the Russian Empire — concluding the Russo-Turkish War, 1806-1812 — the latter annexed the eastern half of the Principality of Moldavia. That region was then called Bessarabia.

Initially, after being annexed by the Russian Empire, Bessarabia enjoyed a period of local autonomy until 1828. Organized as an imperial district (oblast), it was governed by a "provisional government" with two departments: a civil administration and a religious administration, the former led by the aged Moldavian boyar Scarlat Sturdza, the latter – by the archbishop Gavriil Bănulescu-Bodoni. On top of these was the Russian military administration of Governor General Harting. However, already in 1813, the civil administration was handed to the Governor General. In 1818, reform-minded Russian tsar Alexander I passed a Settlement of the establishment of the region of Bessarabia which divided the legal power between the tsar-appointed Governor General (Bakhmetiev) and a 10-member High Council of the Region with 4 members appointed by the tsar and 6 elected by the local nobility. In lieu of the older 12 lands, the region was divided into 6, later 9 counties. In 1828 however, the conservative tsar Nikolai I abrogated the Settlement and passed a new regulation which endowed the Governor General with supreme power, with the regional council having only advisory functions and meeting twice a year. Article 63 of the regulation stated that all administrative personnel must know and perform their duties in Russian. Nevertheless, Romanian language would occasionally appear in documents up to 1854.<ref name=nistor>Ion Nistor, Istoria Basarabiei, 4th edition, Cartea moldovenească, Chișinău, 1991, p. 179-189</ref>

At the end of the Crimean War, in 1856, by the Treaty of Paris, the southern parts of Bessarabia (including a part of Budjak) were returned to Moldavia, which organized the territory into the districts of Cahul, Bolgrad and Ismail. Consequently, Russia lost access to the Danube river. In 1859, the Principalities of Moldavia and Wallachia united and formed the Romanian United Principalities, a vassal state of the Ottoman Empire.

In 1870, the institution of zemstva was instated in the Bessarabian oblast. Cities, communes, counties, and the entire region would elect each a local council representing noblemen, merchants and peasants. They had substantial authority in economic and sanitary areas, including roads, posts, food, public safety and education. On the other hand, political (including justice courts of all levels) and cultural matters remained an exclusive domain of the Governor General and were used as a vehicle of Russification. With the accomplishment of these introductions, in 1871, Bessarabia was transformed into a governorate.

The defeat of the Ottoman Empire in the Russo-Turkish War 1877–1878 and the subsequent signing of the Treaty of Berlin granted independence to Romania. Although the treaty of alliance between Romania and Russia specified that Russia would defend the territorial integrity of Romania and not claim any part of Romania at the end of the war, the southern part of Bessarabia was re-annexed to Russia. In exchange, Romania was given Dobruja, which was at the time part of the Ottoman Empire.

Public education was entrusted to the religious establishment of the region, which since 1821 had only Russian archbishops, and later also to the zemstvos. Dimitrie Sulima (Archbishop in 1821–1855), and Antonie Shokotov (1855–1871) allowed the parallel usage of both Romanian and Russian in church, and did not take any measures to infringe upon the linguistic specifics of the region. With the appointment of Pavel Lebedev (1871–1882), the situation changed radically, and the language of the locals was soon purged from the church. To prevent the printing of religious literature in Romanian, Lebedev closed down the printing press in Chișinău, collected from the region and burned the already printed books in Romanian (in the Cyrillic alphabet). The following archbishops Sergey Lapidevsky, Isakyi Polozensky, Neofit Novodchikov eased some of Lebedev's measures to help quell the serious dissatisfaction of the population. The next Archbishop Iakov Pyatnitsky (1898–1904) discovered that his desire to popularize a Christian culture and a moral education faced a language barrier, and in 1900 convinced the Russian High Synod to allow the publication of religious pamphlets in Romanian, while his follower Archbishop Vladimir allowed the printing of books, and from 1908 even of a regular religious journal "Luminătorul" by Constantin Popovici and Gurie Grosu. The last Russian Archbishops, Serafim Chichyagov (1908–1914), Platon (1914–1915) and Anastasius (1915–1918) tried to preserve the privileged status of the Russian language in the church in Bessarabia, but did not introduce any new anti-Romanian measures. In 1918, after the installation of the Romanian administration in Bessarabia, Archbishop Anastasius refused to subordinate his eparchy to the Romanian Orthodox Church, and was forced into exile. The new authorities entrusted the archbishopric to the Bishop Nicodem de Huși from Romania, who appointed a local Archbishop Dionisie Erhan. Then the Clerical Congress on February 21, 1920, elected Gurie Botoșăneanu as the highest church official in Bessarabia, which afterwards was raised from Archbishop to Metropolitan.

Under the protection of Gavriil Bănulescu-Bodoni and Dimitrie Sulima a theological school and a seminary were opened in Chișinău, and public schools throughout the region: in the cities of Chișinău, Hotin, Cetatea Albă, Briceni, Bender, Bălți, Cahul, Soroca, Orhei, at the monasteries of Dobrușa and Hârjauca, and even in several villages (Rezeni, Mereni, Volcineț, Nisporeni, Hârtop). In 1835, the tsarist authorities declared a 7-year deadline to transfer the education from Romanian to Russian. Although the measure was implemented more gradually, since 1867, Romanian was purged entirely from the education. This had the effect of keeping the peasant population of Bessarabia backward, as witnessed by the fact that in 1912 Moldavians had a literacy rate of only 10.5%, lowest among all ethnic groups of the region (63% for Bessarabian Germans, 50% for Bessarabian Jews, 40% for Russians, 31% for Bessarabian Bulgarians), with a record low 1.7% literacy rate for Moldavian women. Of the 1709 primary schools in Bessarabia in 1912, none was in the language of the main ethnic group.

After 1812, the newly installed Russian authorities expelled the large Nogai Tatar population of Budjak (Little Tartary), and encouraged the settlement of Moldavians, Wallachians, Bulgarians, Ukrainians and others through various fiscal facilities and exemption from military service. The colonization was generated by the need to better exploit the resources of the land, and by the absence of serfdom in Bessarabia. German colonists from Switzerland (canton Lausanne), France, and Germany (Württemberg) settled in 27 localities (most newly settled) in Budjak, and by 1856 Bessarabian Germans were 42,216. Russian veterans of the 1828–1829 war with the Ottomans were settled in 10 localities in Budjak, and three other localities were settled by Cossacks from Dobrudja (which got there from the Dniepr region some 50 years earlier). Bessarabian Bulgarians and Gagauz arrived from modern eastern Bulgaria as early as the second half of the 18th century. In 1817, they numbered 482 families in 12 localities, in 1856 – 115,000 people in 43 localities. Ukrainians had arrived Bessarabia since before 1812, and already in the 1820s they made up one third of the population of the most northern Hotin county. In the following decades more Ukrainians settled throughout the northern part of Bessarabia from Galicia and Podolia. Jews from Galicia, Podolia and Poland also settled in Bessarabia in the 19th century, but mostly in the cities and fairs; in some of these they eventually became a plurality. In 1856, there were 78,751 Bessarabian Jews and according to the Imperial Russian census of 1897, the capital Kishinev had a Jewish population of 50,000, or 46%, out of a total of approximately 110,000. There was even an attempt by the Russian authorities to create 16 Jewish agricultural colonies, where 10,589 people would settle. However within less than 2 generations, most of them sold the land to the local Moldavians and moved to the cities and fairs. The various population movements saw an increase of the Slavic population to more than a fifth of the total population by 1920, while the proportion of the Moldovan population steadily decreased. In absence of any official records on ethnic distribution until the late 19th century, various figures for the ethnic proportions of the region have been advanced. Thus, in the 1920s Romanian historian Ion Nistor alleged that, at the beginning of the Russian administration, Moldavians represented 86% of the population. While according to official statistics speakers of Moldovan and Romanian accounted for 47.8% in 1897, some authors proposed figures as high as 70% for the beginning of the 20th century.

Moldavian Democratic Republic and Union with Romania

After the Russian Revolution of 1905, a Romanian nationalist movement started to develop in Bessarabia. While it received a setback in 1906–1907, the movement re-emerged even stronger in 1917.

To quell the chaos brought about by the Russian revolutions of February and October 1917, a national council, Sfatul Țării, was established in Bessarabia, with 120 members elected in county meetings of peasants, and by political and professional organizations from Bessarabia. On December 15, 1917, the Council proclaimed the Moldavian Democratic Republic, as part of the Russian Republic, then formed the government of Moldavia. With the approval of the Allies and the Russian White general Dmitry Shcherbachev, commander-in-chief of the Russian forces on the Romanian Front, on January 26, 1918, Romanian troops entered Bessarabia, ostensibly as a temporary measure to maintain security, which had deteriorated due to large numbers of deserters from the Russian Army. Corneliu Chirieș, "90 de ani de la Unirea Basarabiei cu România" ("90 Years Since the Union of Bessarabia with Romania") , Observator de Bacău, 23 March 2008 While Romanian historiography generally asserts the intervention was done on the request of Sfatul Țării,Petre P. Panaitescu, Istoria Românilor, 7th edition, Editura didactică și pedagogică, București, 1990, p. 322 the presence of the Romanian army in Bessarabia was protested by some of the republic's leaders, notably Ion Inculeț, president of Sfatul Țării and Pantelimon Erhan, head of the provisional Moldavian executive protesting against it. In particular they feared that big land owners-dominated Romanian Government could use the troops to prevent the envisaged Agrarian reform, a cornerstone priority of the Bessarabian government.

Conditions included territorial autonomy of Bessarabia, an agrarian reform, respect for human freedoms and general amnesty. Nevertheless, as early as the summer of 1918 the Romanian government began encroaching on the existing forms of local autonomy. Thus, the members of the zemstvos were appointed by royal decree, rather than being elected, as had been the case during the Russian rule. The province was subordinated to a royal-appointed General Commissar, and Sfatul Țării was relegated to a consultative position. Furthermore, the state of siege was declared throughout Bessarabia and censorship was instated. Under the pressure of the Romanian central government, worried about the growing dissatisfaction with its administration of the region and the strengthening of the autonomist current, the conditions were nominally dropped by the Sfatul Țării in December 1918. The vote was taken in the presence of only 44 of the 125 members, or, according to other sources, 48 of 160; lacking a quorum, the vote was judged to be illegitimate by some.Charles King, "The Moldovans: Romania, Russia, and the Politics of Culture", Hoover Press, 2000, pg. 35

The union was recognized by Britain, France and Italy, but not by the Soviet government, which claimed the area as the Bessarabian Soviet Socialist Republic, and argued the union was made under conditions of Romanian military occupation by a Council that had not been elected by the people of Bessarabia in elections.

Part of Greater Romania

After 1918 Bessarabia was under Romanian jurisdiction for the next 22 years. This fact was recognized in the 1920 Treaty of Paris which, however, has never come into force since it was not ratified by Japan. The newly communist Russia did not recognize the Romanian rule over Bessarabia. The Bessarabian Soviet Socialist Republic was proclaimed on May 5, 1919, in Odessa as a "Provisional Workers' and Peasants' Government in exile" and established on May 11, 1919, in Tiraspol as an autonomous part of Russian SFSR. Furthermore, Russia and later, the Soviet Union, considered the region to be Soviet territory under foreign occupation and conducted numerous diplomatic attempts to reclaim it. No diplomatic relations existed between the two states until 1934. During that time, both countries subscribed to the principle of non-violent resolution of territorial disputes in the Kellogg-Briand Treaty of 1928 and the Treaty of London of July 1933. Meanwhile, the neighboring region of Transnistria, part of the Ukrainian SSR at the time, was formed into the Moldavian ASSR after the failure of the Tatarbunary Uprising in 1924.

The land reform, implemented by Sfatul Țării in 1918–1919, resulted in a rise of a middle class, as 87% of the region's population lived in rural areas. The reform was however marred by the small size of the awarded plots, as well as by preferential allotment of land to politicians and administrative personnel who had supported the political goals of the Romanian government. Generally, urban development and industry were insignificant, and the region remained primarily an agrarian rural region throughout the interwar period. Certain improvements were achieved in the area of education, the literacy rate rising from 15.6% in 1897 to 37% by 1930; however, Bessarabia continued to lag behind the rest of the country, the national literacy rate being 60%. During the inter-war period, Romanian authorities also conducted a program of Romanianization that sought to assimilate ethnic minorities throughout the country. The enforcement of this policy was especially pervasive in Bessarabia due to its highly diverse population, and resulted in the closure of minority educational and cultural institutions.

On 1 January 1919 the Municipal Conservatory (the Academy of Music) was created in Chişinău, in 1927 – the Faculty of Theology, in 1934 the subsidiary of the Romanian Institute of social sciences, in 1939 – municipal picture gallery. The Agricultural State University of Moldova was founded in 1933 in Chișinău. The Museum of Fine Arts was founded in 1939 by the sculptor Alexandru Plămădeală. Gurie Grosu was the first Metropolitan of Bessarabia.

The first scheduled flights to Chișinău started on 24 June 1926, on the route Bucharest – Galați – Iași – Chișinău. The flights were operated by Compagnie Franco-Roumaine de Navigation Aérienne – CFRNA, later LARES.

The first society of the Romanian writers in Chișinău was formed in 1920, among the members were Mihail Sadoveanu, Ștefan Ciobanu, Tudor Pamfile, Nicolae Dunăreanu, N.N.Beldiceanu, Apostol D.Culea. Writer and Journalist Bessarabian Society took an institutionalized form in 1940. The First Congress of the Society elected as president Pan Halippa as Vice President Nicolae Spătaru, and as secretary general Nicolae Costenco.

Viața Basarabiei was founded in 1932 by Pan Halippa. Radio Basarabia was launched on 8 October 1939, as the second radio station of the Romanian Radio Broadcasting Company. The Capitoline Wolf was opened in 1926 and in 1928 the Stephen the Great Monument, by the sculptor Alexandru Plămădeală, was opened.

World War II and Soviet era

After the establishment of the Soviet Union in December 1922, the Soviet government moved in 1924 to establish the Moldavian Autonomous Oblast on the lands to the east of the Dniester River in the Ukrainian SSR. The capital of the oblast was Balta, situated in present-day Ukraine. Seven months later, the oblast was upgraded to the Moldavian Autonomous Soviet Socialist Republic (Moldavian ASSR or MASSR), even though its population was only 30% ethnic Romanian. The capital remained at Balta until 1929, when it was moved to Tiraspol.

In the secret protocol attached to the 1939 Molotov–Ribbentrop Pact defining the division of the spheres of influence in Eastern Europe, Nazi Germany declared it had no political interest in Bessarabia, in response to the Soviet Union's expression of interest, thereby consigning Bessarabia to the Soviet "sphere". On June 26, 1940, the Soviet government issued an ultimatum to the Romanian minister in Moscow, demanding Romania immediately cede Bessarabia and Northern Bukovina. Italy and Germany, which needed a stable Romania and access to its oil fields, urged King Carol II to do so. On June 28, Soviet troops crossed the Dniester and occupied Bessarabia, Northern Bukovina, and the Hertsa region.

The Soviet republic created following annexation did not follow Bessarabia's traditional border. The Moldavian Soviet Socialist Republic (Moldavian SSR), established on August 2, 1940, consisted of six and a half counties of Bessarabia joined with the westernmost part of the already extant MASSR (an autonomous entity within the Ukrainian SSR). Various changes were made to its borders, which were finally settled by November 1940. Territories where ethnic Ukrainians formed a large portion of the population (parts of Northern Bukovina and parts of Hotin, Akkerman, and Izmail) went to Ukraine, while a small strip of Transnistria east of the Dniester with a significant (49% of inhabitants) Moldovan population was joined to the MSSR. The transfer of Bessarabia's Black Sea and Danube frontage to Ukraine insured its control by a stable Soviet republic. This transfer, along with the division of Bessarabia, was also designed to discourage future Romanian claims and irredentism.

Under early Soviet rule, deportations of locals to the northern Urals, to Siberia, and Kazakhstan occurred regularly throughout the Stalinist period, with the largest ones on 12–13 June 1941, and 5–6 July 1949, accounting for 19,000 and 35,000 deportees respectively (from MSSR alone). In 1940–1941, ca. 90,000 inhabitants of the annexed territories were subject to political persecutions, such as arrests, deportations, or executions.

By participating in the 1941 Axis invasion of the Soviet Union, pro-German Romania seized the lost territories of Bessarabia, Northern Bukovina, as well as those of the former MASSR, and established its administration there. In occupied Transnistria, Romanian forces, working with the Germans, deported ca. 147,000 Jews from the territories of Bessarabia and Bukovina, of whom over 90,000 perished in ghettoes and concentration camps.

By April 1944, successful offensives of the Soviet Army occupied northern Moldavia and Transnistria, and by the end of August 1944 the entire territory was under Soviet control, with Soviet Army units entering Kishinev on 24 August 1944. The Paris peace treaty signed in February 1947 fixed the Romanian-Soviet border to the one established in June 1940.Charles King, The Moldovans: Romania, Russia, and the politics of culture, Hoover Institution Press, Stanford University, 2000. , p.91

The territory remained part of the Soviet Union after World War II as the Moldavian Soviet Socialist Republic. Soviet Union created the universal educational system, brought high-tech industry and science.  Most of these industries were built in Transnistria and around large cities, while in the rest of the republic agriculture was developed. By the late Soviet period, the urban intelligentsia and government officials were dominated mostly by ethnic Moldovans, while Russians and Ukrainians made up most of the technical and engineering specialists.

The conditions imposed during the reestablishment of Soviet rule became the basis of deep resentment toward Soviet authorities, manifested in numerous resistance movements to Soviet rule. In 1946, as a result of a severe drought and excessive delivery quota obligations and requisitions imposed by the Soviet government, the southwestern part of the USSR suffered from a major famine resulting in a minimum of 115,000 deaths among the peasants. During Leonid Brezhnev's 1950–1952 tenure as the First Secretary of the Communist Party of Moldavia (CPM), he was ruthless comparing to his predecessor Nicolae Coval in putting down numerous resistance groups, and issuing harsh sentences. During the Operation North, 723 families (2,617 persons) were deported from the Moldavian SSR, on the night of March 31 to April 1, 1951, members of Neoprotestant sects, mostly Jehovah's Witnesses, qualified as religious elements considered a potential danger for the communist regime.Elena Șișcanu, Basarabia sub ergimul bolşevic (1940–1952), București, Ed. Semne, 1998, p.111 

Most political and academic positions were given to members of non-Romanian ethnic groups (only 17.5% of the Moldavian SSR's political leaders were ethnic Romanians in 1940).William Crowther, "Ethnicity and Participation in the Communist Party of Moldavia", in Journal of Soviet Nationalities I, no. 1990, p. 148-49

Although Brezhnev and other CPM first secretaries were largely successful in suppressing Romanian irredentism in the 1950s–1980s, Mikhail Gorbachev's administration facilitated the revival of the movement in the region. His policies of glasnost and perestroika created conditions in which nationalistic feelings could be openly expressed and in which the Soviet republics could consider reforms.

In the 1970s and 1980s Moldova received substantial investment from the budget of the USSR to develop industrial, scientific facilities, as well as housing. In 1971 the Council of Ministers of the USSR adopted a decision "About the measures for further development of Kishinev city" that secured more than one billion roubles of funds for Chisinau alone from the USSR budget. Subsequent decisions directed large amounts of funds and brought qualified specialists from all over the USSR to further develop the Moldavian SSR. Such an allocation of USSR assets was influenced by the fact that the-then leader of the Soviet Union, Leonid Brezhnev, was the First Secretary of the local Communist Party in the 1950s. These investments stopped in 1991 with the dissolution of the Soviet Union, when Moldova became independent.

Independent Republic of Moldova 1991

Gaining independence

In the climate of Mikhail Gorbachev's perestroika and glasnost, national sentiment escalated in the Moldavian SSR in 1988. In 1989, the Popular Front of Moldova was formed as an association of independent cultural and political groups and gained official recognition. The Popular Front organized a number of large demonstrations, which led to the designation of Moldovan as the official language of the MSSR on August 31, 1989, and a return to the Latin alphabet.

However, opposition was growing to the increasingly exclusionary nationalist policies of the Popular Front, especially in Transnistria, where the Yedinstvo-Unitatea (Unity) Intermovement had been formed in 1988 by Slavic minorities, and in the south, where the organization Gagauz Halkî (Gagauz People), formed in November 1989, came to represent the Gagauz, a Turkic-speaking minority there.

The first democratic elections to the Moldavian SSR's Supreme Soviet were held on February 25, 1990. Runoff elections were held in March. The Popular Front won a majority of the votes. After the elections, Mircea Snegur, a reformed communist, was elected chairman of the Supreme Soviet; in September he became president of the republic. The reformist government that took over in May 1990 made many changes that did not please the minorities, including changing the republic's name in June from the Moldavian Soviet Socialist Republic to the Soviet Socialist Republic of Moldova and declaring it sovereign the following month. At the same time, Romanian tricolor with the Moldavian coat-of-arms was adopted as the state flag, and Deșteaptă-te române!, the Romanian anthem, became the anthem of the SSRM. During that period a Movement for unification of Romania and the Republic of Moldova became active in each country.

In August 1990, following a refusal of the increasingly nationalist republican government, to grant cultural and territorial autonomy to Gagauzia and Transnistria, two regions populated primarily by ethnic minorities. In response, the Gagauz Autonomous Soviet Socialist Republic was declared in the south, in the city of Comrat. In September in Tiraspol, the main city on the east bank of the Dniester River, the Pridnestrovian Moldavian Soviet Socialist Republic (commonly called the "Dnestr Republic", later Transnistria) followed suit. The parliament of Moldova immediately declared these declarations null and void.

In mid-October 1990, approximately 30,000 Moldovan nationalist volunteers were sent to Gagauzia and Transnistria, where an outbreak of violence was averted by the intervention of the Soviet 14th Army. (The Soviet 14th Army, now the Russian 14th Army, had been headquartered in Chișinău since 1956.) However, negotiations in Moscow between the Gagauz and Transnistrian leadership, and the government of the Soviet Socialist Republic of Moldova failed.

In May 1991, the country's official name was changed to the Republic of Moldova (Republica Moldova). The name of the Supreme Soviet also was changed, to the Moldovan Parliament.

During the 1991 Soviet coup d'état attempt in Moscow against Mikhail Gorbachev, commanders of the Soviet Union's Southwestern Theater of Military Operations attempted to impose a state of emergency in Moldova. They were overruled by the Moldovan government, which declared its support for Russian president Boris Yeltsin, who led the counter-coup in Moscow. On 27 August 1991, following the coup's collapse, Moldova declared its independence from the Soviet Union.

The December elections of Stepan Topal and Igor Smirnov as presidents of Gagauzia and Transnistria respectively, and the official dissolution of the Soviet Union at the end of the year, had further increased tensions in Moldova.

Transnistria

Transnistria is the region east of the Dniester River, which includes a large proportion of predominantly Russophone ethnic Russians and Ukrainians (51%, as of 1989, with ethnic Moldovans forming a 40% minority). The headquarters of the Soviet 14th Guards Army was located in the regional capital Tiraspol. There, on September 2, 1990, local authorities proclaimed an independent Pridnestrovian Moldavian Soviet Socialist Republic. The motives behind this move were fear of the rise of nationalism in Moldova and the country's expected reunification with Romania upon secession from the USSR. In the winter of 1991–1992 clashes occurred between Transnistrian forces and the Moldovan police. Between March 2 and July 26, 1992, the conflict escalated into a military engagement. Following Russian intervention of the 14th Guards Army into the conflict on the side of the separatists, the war was stopped and the Moscow Agreement on the principles of peace settlement of armed conflict in Trans-Dniester districts of the republic of Moldova was signed on 21 July 1992.

As of 2007, the Russian military remains in Transnistria, despite Russia having signed international agreements to withdraw, and against the will of Moldovan government. Jamestown: "Moldovan President wants out of Russia's orbit" The government of Moldova continues to offer extensive autonomy to Transnistria, while the government of Transnistria demands independence. De jure, Transnistria is internationally recognized as part of Moldova, but de facto, the Moldovan government does not exercise any control over the territory.

Independence: the early years, 1991–2001

On 8 December 1991, Mircea Snegur, an ex-communist reformer, ran an unopposed election for the presidency. On March 2, 1992, the country achieved formal recognition as an independent state at the United Nations.

In 1992, Moldova became involved in a brief conflict against local insurgents in Transnistria, who were aided by the Russian 14th Guards Army and Russian, Ukrainian and Don Cossack volunteers, which resulted in the failure of Moldova, supported by Romania, to regain control over the breakaway republic.

Starting 1993, Moldova began to distance itself from Romania. The 1994 Constitution of Moldova used the term "Moldovan language" instead of "Romanian" and changed the national anthem to "Limba noastră".

On January 2, 1992, Moldova introduced a market economy, liberalizing prices, which resulted in huge inflation. From 1992 to 2001, the young country suffered its worst economic crisis, leaving most of the population below the poverty line. In 1993, a national currency, the Moldovan leu, was introduced to replace the Soviet rouble. The end of the planned economy also meant that industrial enterprises would have to buy supplies and sell their goods by themselves, and most of the management was unprepared for such a change. Moldova's industry, especially machine building, became all but defunct, and unemployment skyrocketed. The economic fortunes of Moldova began to change in 2001; since then the country has seen a steady annual growth of between 5% and 10%. In the early 2000s, there was also a considerable growth of emigration of Moldovans looking for work (mostly illegally) in Italy, Portugal, Spain, Greece, Cyprus, Turkey, Russia and other countries. Remittances from Moldovans abroad account for almost 38% of Moldova's GDP, the second-highest percentage in the world. Officially, Moldova's annual GDP is on the order of $1,000 per capita; however, a significant part of the economy goes unregistered as a result of corruption.

The pro-nationalist governments of prime ministers Mircea Druc (May 25, 1990 – May 28, 1991), and Valeriu Muravschi (May 28, 1991 – July 1, 1992), were followed by a more moderate government of Andrei Sangheli, during which there was a decline of the pro-Romanian nationalist sentiment. After the 1994 elections, Moldovan Parliament adopted measures that distanced Moldova from Romania. The new Moldovan Constitution also provided for autonomy for Transnistria and Gagauzia. On December 23, 1994, the Parliament of Moldova adopted a "Law on the Special Legal Status of Gagauzia", and in 1995 it was constituted.

After winning the presidential elections of 1996, on January 15, 1997, Petru Lucinschi, the former First Secretary of the Moldavian Communist Party in 1989–91, became the country's second president. After the legislative elections on March 22, 1998, the Alliance for Democracy and Reform was formed by non-Communist parties. However, the term of the new government of Prime Minister Ion Ciubuc (January 24, 1997– February 1, 1999) was marked by chronic political instability, which prevented a coherent reform program. The 1998 financial crisis in Russia, Moldova's main economic partner at the time, produced an economic crisis in the country. The standard of living plunged, with 75% of population living below the poverty line, while the economic disaster caused 600,000 people to emigrate.

New governments were formed by Ion Sturza (February 19 – November 9, 1999) and Dumitru Braghiş (December 21, 1999 – April 19, 2001). On July 21, 2000, the Parliament adopted an amendment to the Constitution that transformed Moldova from a presidential to a parliamentary republic, in which the president is elected by three fifths of the votes in the parliament, and no longer directly by the people.

Return of the Communists, 2001–2009

Only 3 of the 31 political parties won more than the 6% of the popular vote required to win seats in parliament in the February 25, 2001 elections. Winning 49.9% of the vote, the Party of Communists of the Republic of Moldova (reinstituted in 1993 after being outlawed in 1991), gained 71 of the 101 parliament seats, and elected Vladimir Voronin as the country's third president on April 4, 2001. A new government was formed on April 19, 2001, by Vasile Tarlev. The country became the first post-Soviet state where a non-reformed communist party returned to power. In March–April 2002, the opposition Christian-Democratic People's Party organized a mass protest in Chișinău against the plans of the government to fulfill its electoral promise and introduce Russian as the second state language along with its compulsory study in schools. The government annulled these plans.

The relationship between Moldova and Russia deteriorated in November 2003 over a Russian proposal for the solution of the Transnistria conflict, which Moldovan authorities refused to accept because it stipulated a 20-year Russian military presence in Moldova. The federalization plan for Moldova would have also turned Transnistria and Gagauzia into a blocking minority over all major policy matters of Moldova. As of 2006, approximately 1,200 of the 14th Army personnel remain stationed in Transnistria, guarding a large ammunitions depot at Colbasna. In recent years, negotiations between the Transnistrian and Moldovan leaders have been going on under the mediation of the Organization for Security and Co-operation in Europe (OSCE), Russia, and Ukraine; lately observers from the European Union and the United States have become involved, creating a 5+2 format.

In the wake of the November 2003 deadlock with Russia, a series of shifts in the external policy of Moldova occurred, targeted at rapprochement with the European Union. In the context of the EU's expansion to the east, Moldova wants to sign the Stability and Association Agreement. It implemented its first three-year action plan within the framework of the European Neighborhood Policy (ENP) of the EU.

In the March 2005 elections, the Party of the Communists (PCRM) won 46% of the vote, (56 of the 101 seats in the Parliament), the Democratic Moldova Block (BMD) won 28.5% of the vote (34 MPs), and the Christian Democratic People Party (PPCD) won 9.1% (11 MPs). On April 4, 2005, Vladimir Voronin was re-elected as country's president, supported by a part of the opposition, and on April 8, Vasile Tarlev was again appointed head of government. On March 31, 2008, Vasile Tarlev was replaced by Zinaida Greceanîi as head of the government.

Following the parliamentary elections on April 5, 2009, the Communist Party won 49.48% of the votes, followed by the Liberal Party with 13.14% of the votes, the Liberal Democratic Party with 12.43% and the Alliance "Moldova Noastră" with 9.77%. The opposition leaders have protested against the outcome calling it fraudulent and demanded a repeated election. A preliminary report by OSCE observers called the vote generally free and fair. However, one member of the OSCE observation team expressed concerns over that conclusion and said that she and a number of other team members feel that there had been some manipulation, but they were unable to find any proof.

On April 6, 2009, several NGOs and opposition parties organized a protest in Chișinău, gathering a crowd of about 15,000 with the help of social network sites such as Twitter and Facebook. The protesters accused the Communist government of electoral fraud. Anti-communist and pro-Romanian slogans were widely used. The demonstration had spun out of control on April 7 and escalated into a riot when a part of the crowd attacked the presidential offices and broke into the parliament building, looting and setting its interior on fire."The protest initiative group: LDPM is the guilty one for the devastations in the Chișinău downtown", April 08, 2009 Police had regained control on the night of April 8, arresting and detaining several hundred protesters. Numerous detainees reported beatings by the police when released.Al Jazeera English: "Violent protests after Moldova poll ", 7 April 2009. The violence on both sides (demonstrators and police) was condemned by the OSCE and other international organizations. Three young people died during the day the protests took place. The opposition blamed police abuse for these deaths, while the government claimed they were either unrelated to the protests, or accidents. Government officials, including President Vladimir Voronin, called the rioting a coup d'état attempt and accused Romania of organizing it. The opposition accused the government of organizing the riots by introducing agents provocateurs among the protesters. The political climate in Moldova remained unstable. The parliament failed to elect a new president. For this reason, the parliament was dissolved and new general elections were held on July 29, 2009, with the Communists losing power to the Alliance for European Integration, a pro-European coalition.

Liberal Democrat and Socialist administrations, 2009 to present

An attempt by the new ruling coalition to amend the constitution of Moldova via a referendum in 2010 in order to enable presidential election by popular vote failed due to lack of turnout. The parliamentary election in November 2010 had retained the status quo between the ruling coalition and the communist opposition. On 16 March 2012, parliament elected Nicolae Timofti as president by 62 votes out of 101, with the PCRM boycotting the election, putting an end to a political crisis that had lasted since April 2009. Moldova had no had full-time president, but three acting presidents, since Vladimir Voronin resigned in September 2009.Washington Post, Moldova elects pro-European judge Timofti as president, ending 3 years of political deadlock  In the November 2014 elections the pro-European parties maintained their majority in parliament.

In November 2016, pro-Russia candidate Igor Dodon won the presidential election, defeating his rival Maia Sandu. The 2019 parliamentary election resulted a vote split between pro-Western and pro-Russian forces. The opposition Socialists, who favor closer ties to Moscow, became the largest party with 35 out of 101 seats. The ruling Democratic Party, which wants closer integration with the EU, came second with 30 seats. Opposition bloc called ACUM, campaigning with anti-corruption agenda, was third with 26 seats. In 2019, from 7 June to 15 June, the Moldovan government went through a period of dual power in what is known as the 2019 Moldovan constitutional crisis. In November 2019, Ion Chicu became new Prime Minister, following the fall of the former government led by pro-Western Maja Sandu.

In November 2020, opposition candidate Maia Sandu won Moldova's presidential election after a run-off vote against the incumbent Igor Dodon. She became the first female President of Moldova.

In July 2021, President Maia Sandu's pro-Western PAS party won a snap election, resulting Parliament confirmed Sandu's nomination of Natalia Gavrilita as the new prime minister.

On 24 May 2022, former president of Moldova, Igor Dodon, was arrested. Dodon, leader of Moldova's main pro-Russian opposition, Socialist Party, was accused of taking bribes. Moldovas's pro-Western and pro-Russian factions became increasingly divided since Russia's invasion of Ukraine on 24 February 2022.

On 10 February 2023 President Sandu accepted PM Gavrilita's resignation, and installed Dorin Recean in place.

See also

Bessarabia
Dissolution of the Soviet Union
History of Ukraine
List of presidents of Moldova
List of prime ministers of Moldova
Moldavia
Politics of Moldova

Notes

Further reading

 Brezianu, Andrei, and Vlad Spânu. The A to Z of Moldova (Scarecrow Press, 2010).
 Chinn, Jeff, and Steven D. Roper. "Ethnic mobilization and reactive nationalism: The case of Moldova." Nationalities papers 23.2 (1995): 291-325 online.
 King,  Charles. The Moldovans: Romania, Russia, and the Politics of Culture (Hoover Institution Press, 2000).
 Lutsevych, Orysia. How to finish a revolution: Civil society and democracy in Georgia, Moldova and Ukraine (Chatham House, 2013).
 Mitrasca, Marcel. Moldova: A Romanian Province Under Russian Rule (Algora, 2002).
 Quinlan, Paul D. "Moldova under Lucinschi." Demokratizatsiya 10.1 (2002): 83–103.
 RAND, Russia’s Hostile Measures: Combating Russian Gray Zone Aggression Against NATO in the Contact, Blunt, and Surge Layers of Competition (2020) online on Transnistria
 Way, Lucan A. "Authoritarian state building and the sources of regime competitiveness in the fourth wave: The cases of Belarus, Moldova, Russia, and Ukraine." World Politics 57.2 (2005): 231–261.
 Way, Lucan A. "Weak states and pluralism: The case of Moldova." East European Politics and Societies'' 17.03 (2003): 454–482. online

External links
 The Republic of Moldova: An Historical Background, Survey by Dr. Vasile Nedelciuc
 History of Moldova: Primary Documents
 Istoria Moldovei